The 2020 Texas Longhorns baseball team represented the University of Texas at Austin during the 2020 NCAA Division I baseball season. 
The Longhorns played their home games at UFCU Disch–Falk Field as a member of the Big 12 Conference. 
They were led by head coach David Pierce, in his fourth season at Texas.

Due to the COVID-19 pandemic, the remainder of the season was canceled after March 13

Personnel

Roster

Coaches

Schedule and results

! style=""|Regular Season
|- valign="top" 

|-bgcolor=bbffbb
| Feb 14 || at * || #22 || Reckling Park • Houston, TX || W 7–4 || Elder (1–0) || DeLeon (0–1) || Diaz (1) || 3,044 || 1–0 || –
|-bgcolor=bbffbb
| Feb 15 || at Rice* || #22 || Reckling Park • Houston, TX || W 4–0 || Madden (1–0) || Brogdon (0–1) ||  || 4,001 || 2–0 || –
|-bgcolor=bbffbb
| Feb 16 || at Rice* || #22 || Reckling Park • Houston, TX || W 5–4 || Stevens (1–0) || Bordwine (0–1) || Diaz (2) || 3,485 || 3–0 || –
|-bgcolor=bbffbb
| Feb 18 || * || #22 || UFCU Disch–Falk Field • Austin, TX || W 6–2 || Stevens (2–0) || McKay (0–1) || Hansen (1) || 4,424 || 4–0 || –
|-bgcolor=bbffbb
| Feb 19 || Lamar* || #22 || UFCU Disch–Falk Field • Austin, TX || W 6–1 || Kubichek (1–0) || Hranicky (0–1) ||  || 3,999 || 5–0 || –
|-bgcolor=bbffbb
| Feb 21 || * || #22 || UFCU Disch–Falk Field • Austin, TX || W 7–0 || Elder (2–0) || Weston (0–1) ||  || 4,876 || 6–0 || –
|-bgcolor=bbffbb
| Feb 22 || Boise State* || #22 || UFCU Disch–Falk Field • Austin, TX || W 2–1 || Madden (2–0) || Omlid (0–1) ||  || 5,739 || 7–0 || –
|-bgcolor=bbffbb
| Feb 23 || Boise State* || #22 || UFCU Disch–Falk Field • Austin, TX || W 7–5 10 || Merryman (1–0) || Flesland (0–1) ||  || 5,124 || 8–0 || –
|-bgcolor=bbffbb
| Feb 25 || * || #16 || UFCU Disch–Falk Field • Austin, TX || W 4–1 || Hansen (1–0) || Rogers (0–1) || Duplantier II (1) || 4,750 || 9–0 || –
|-bgcolor=ffbbbb
| Feb 28 || vs. #19 LSU* || #16 || Minute Maid Park • Houston, TX (Shriners College Classic) || L 3–4 || Henry (2–1) || Elder (2–1) || Hill (1) || 15,735 || 9–1 || –
|-bgcolor=bbffbb
| Feb 29 || vs. #3 Arkansas* || #16 || Minute Maid Park • Houston, TX (Shriners College Classic) || W 8–7 || Madden (3–0) || Wicklander (2–1) || Duplantier II (2) || 15,972 || 10–1 || –
|-

|-bgcolor=ffbbbb
| Mar 1 || vs. Missouri* || #16 || Minute Maid Park • Houston, TX (Shriners College Classic) || L 8–9 || Willhelm (1–0) || Kubichek (1–1) || Dillard (2) || 11,528 || 10–2 || –
|-bgcolor=ffbbbb
| Mar 3 || Arizona* || #19 || UFCU Disch–Falk Field • Austin, TX || L 6–8 || Vannelle (1–0) || Meaney (0–1) ||  || 4,552 || 10–3 || –
|-bgcolor=bbffbb
| Mar 6 || * || #19  || UFCU Disch–Falk Field • Austin, TX || W 6–1 || Merryman (2–0) || Bibee (1–3 ||  || 5,611 || 11–3 || –
|-bgcolor=bbffbb
| Mar 7 || Cal State Fullerton* || #19  || UFCU Disch–Falk Field • Austin, TX || W 4–3 || Hansen (2–0) || Groeneweg (0–1) || Duplantier II (3) || 5,806 || 12–3 || – 
|-bgcolor=bbffbb
| Mar 8 || Cal State Fullerton* || #19  || UFCU Disch–Falk Field • Austin, TX || W 8–4 || Merryman (3–0) || Magrisi (0–3) ||  || 5,957 || 13–3 || –
|-bgcolor=bbffbb
| Mar 11 || * || #17 || UFCU Disch–Falk Field • Austin, TX || W 9–1 || Kubichek (2–1) || Krawietz (0–1) ||  || 5,068 || 14–3 || –
|-bgcolor=bbbbbb
| Mar 13 || * || #17 || UFCU Disch–Falk Field • Austin, TX || colspan=7 |Games cancelled due to the COVID-19 pandemic
|-bgcolor=bbbbbb
| Mar 14 || New Mexico* || #17 || UFCU Disch–Falk Field • Austin, TX ||  ||  ||  ||  ||  ||  || 
|-bgcolor=bbbbbb
| Mar 15 || New Mexico* || #17 || UFCU Disch–Falk Field • Austin, TX ||  ||  ||  ||  ||  ||  ||
|-bgcolor=bbbbbb
| Mar 17 || * ||  || UFCU Disch–Falk Field • Austin, TX ||  ||  ||  ||  ||  ||  || 
|-bgcolor=bbbbbb
| Mar 18 || UT Arlington* ||  || Dr Pepper Ballpark • Frisco, TX ||  ||  ||  ||  ||  ||  ||
|-bgcolor=bbbbbb
| Mar 20 || at Oklahoma ||  || L. Dale Mitchell Baseball Park • Norman, OK ||  ||  ||  ||  ||  ||  || 
|-bgcolor=bbbbbb
| Mar 21 || at Oklahoma ||  || L. Dale Mitchell Baseball Park • Norman, OK ||  ||  ||  ||  ||  ||  || 
|-bgcolor=bbbbbb
| Mar 22 || at Oklahoma ||  || L. Dale Mitchell Baseball Park • Norman, OK ||  ||  ||  ||  ||  ||  ||
|-bgcolor=bbbbbb
| Mar 24 || at Texas State* ||  || Bobcat Ballpark • San Marcos, TX ||  ||  ||  ||  ||  ||  ||
|-bgcolor=bbbbbb
| Mar 27 || Oklahoma State ||  || UFCU Disch–Falk Field • Austin, TX ||  ||  ||  ||  ||  ||  || 
|-bgcolor=bbbbbb
| Mar 28 || Oklahoma State ||  || UFCU Disch–Falk Field • Austin, TX ||  ||  ||  ||  ||  ||  || 
|-bgcolor=bbbbbb
| Mar 29 || Oklahoma State ||  || UFCU Disch–Falk Field • Austin, TX ||  ||  ||  ||  ||  ||  ||
|-bgcolor=bbbbbb
| Mar 31 || at Texas A&M* ||  || Olsen Field at Blue Bell Park • College Station, TX ||  ||  ||  ||  ||  ||  || 
|-

|-bgcolor=bbbbbb
| Apr 3 || at  ||  || Monongalia County Ballpark • Granville, WV ||  ||  ||  ||  ||  ||  || 
|-bgcolor=bbbbbb
| Apr 4 || at West Virginia ||  || Monongalia County Ballpark • Granville, WV ||  ||  ||  ||  ||  ||  || 
|-bgcolor=bbbbbb
| Apr 5 || at West Virginia ||  || Monongalia County Ballpark • Granville, WV ||  ||  ||  ||  ||  ||  ||
|-bgcolor=bbbbbb
| Apr 7 || at * ||  || Schroeder Park • Houston, TX ||  ||  ||  ||  ||  ||  ||
|-bgcolor=bbbbbb
| Apr 9 ||  ||  || UFCU Disch–Falk Field • Austin, TX ||  ||  ||  ||  ||  ||  || 
|-bgcolor=bbbbbb
| Apr 10 || Baylor ||  || UFCU Disch–Falk Field • Austin, TX ||  ||  ||  ||  ||  ||  || 
|-bgcolor=bbbbbb
| Apr 11 || Baylor ||  || UFCU Disch–Falk Field • Austin, TX ||  ||  ||  ||  ||  ||  ||
|-bgcolor=bbbbbb
| Apr 13 || at * ||  || Whataburger Field • Corpus Christi, TX ||  ||  ||  ||  ||  ||  || 
|-bgcolor=bbbbbb
| Apr 14 || Texas A&M–Corpus Christi* ||  || UFCU Disch–Falk Field • Austin, TX ||  ||  ||  ||  ||  ||  ||
|-bgcolor=bbbbbb
| Apr 17 ||  ||  || UFCU Disch–Falk Field • Austin, TX ||  ||  ||  ||  ||  ||  || 
|-bgcolor=bbbbbb
| Apr 18 || Kansas ||  || UFCU Disch–Falk Field • Austin, TX ||  ||  ||  ||  ||  ||  || 
|-bgcolor=bbbbbb
| Apr 19 || Kansas ||  || UFCU Disch–Falk Field • Austin, TX ||  ||  ||  ||  ||  ||  ||
|-bgcolor=bbbbbb
| Apr 21 || Texas State* ||  || UFCU Disch–Falk Field • Austin, TX ||  ||  ||  ||  ||  ||  ||
|-bgcolor=bbbbbb
| Apr 24 || at  ||  || Tointon Family Stadium • Manhattan, KS ||  ||  ||  ||  ||  ||  || 
|-bgcolor=bbbbbb
| Apr 25 || at Kansas State ||  || Tointon Family Stadium • Manhattan, KS ||  ||  ||  ||  ||  ||  || 
|-bgcolor=bbbbbb
| Apr 26 || at Kansas State ||  || Tointon Family Stadium • Manhattan, KS ||  ||  ||  ||  ||  ||  ||
|-bgcolor=bbbbbb
| Apr 28 || * ||  || UFCU Disch–Falk Field • Austin, TX ||  ||  ||  ||  ||  ||  || 
|-

|-bgcolor=bbbbbb
| May 1 || at Texas Tech ||  || Dan Law Field at Rip Griffin Park • Lubbock, TX ||  ||  ||  ||  ||  ||  || 
|-bgcolor=bbbbbb
| May 2 || at Texas Tech ||  || Dan Law Field at Rip Griffin Park • Lubbock, TX ||  ||  ||  ||  ||  ||  || 
|-bgcolor=bbbbbb
| May 3 || at Texas Tech ||  || Dan Law Field at Rip Griffin Park • Lubbock, TX ||  ||  ||  ||  ||  ||  ||
|-bgcolor=bbbbbb
| May 6 || * ||  || UFCU Disch–Falk Field • Austin, TX ||  ||  ||  ||  ||  ||  ||
|-bgcolor=bbbbbb
| May 8 || TCU ||  || UFCU Disch–Falk Field • Austin, TX ||  ||  ||  ||  ||  ||  || 
|-bgcolor=bbbbbb
| May 9 || TCU ||  || UFCU Disch–Falk Field • Austin, TX ||  ||  ||  ||  ||  ||  || 
|-bgcolor=bbbbbb
| May 10 || TCU ||  || UFCU Disch–Falk Field • Austin, TX ||  ||  ||  ||  ||  ||  ||
|-bgcolor=bbbbbb
| May 12 || * ||  || UFCU Disch–Falk Field • Austin, TX ||  ||  ||  ||  ||  ||  || 
|-

|-
| style="font-size:88%" | All rankings from Collegiate Baseball.

Rankings

References

Texas Longhorns
Texas Longhorns baseball seasons
Texas Longhorns Baseball